Diamond Danae-Aziza DeShields (born March 5, 1995) is an American professional basketball player for the Dallas Wings of the Women's National Basketball Association (WNBA). She was drafted by the Chicago Sky with the third overall pick in the 2018 WNBA draft, and won a championship with the Sky in 2021. She is the daughter of former MLB player Delino DeShields and the younger sister of MLB player Delino DeShields Jr.

College career
DeShields graduated from Norcross High School in Norcross, Georgia. Playing for the school's basketball team, she was a part of three state champions and averaged 26 points per game in her senior year. DeShields enrolled at the University of North Carolina at Chapel Hill, where she played guard for the North Carolina Tar Heels women's basketball team in her freshman year of college. She set an Atlantic Coast Conference record for points scored by a freshman with 648. After her freshman year, DeShields transferred University of Tennessee, where she played for the Tennessee Lady Volunteers basketball team for two years after sitting out for the season after her transfer. In the 2016-17 season, DeShields led the Lady Vols with 17.4 points per game and was chosen to the All-Southeastern Conference's first team.

Professional career

European leagues 
Though DeShields graduated with her bachelor's degree after her second season at Tennessee, she retained a year of eligibility for college basketball. After initially announcing she would return for the 2017-18 season, she opted to leave Tennessee to play professionally in Turkey. DeShields signed with Çukurova Basketbol of the Turkish Super League, where she averaged 17.4 points, 6.4 rebounds, and 3.8 assists per game.

WNBA

Chicago Sky (2018–2021) 
DeShields was drafted by the Chicago Sky with the third pick of the 2018 WNBA draft. In her first season in the WNBA, she averaged 14.4 points per game while starting in 33 of 34 games played. She was named to the All-Rookie Team.

In 2019, her sophomore season, DeShields was named a WNBA All-Star. During the All-Star Weekend, she won the Skills Challenge, beating out Jonquel Jones in the final round. DeShields started all 34 games and averaged 16.2 points per game. On September 11, 2019, she played in her first career postseason game and scored 25 points, as the Chicago Sky defeated the Phoenix Mercury 105–76. It was the fifth-most points scored by a WNBA player in a postseason debut in league history. DeShields scored 23 points in the Sky's loss to the Las Vegas Aces in the second round of the playoffs.

In December 2019, while playing overseas in Turkey, DeShields suffered a back injury. An MRI following the injury revealed that she had a tumor (a lumbar spinal schwannoma) in her spine, which posed a serious risk of permanent paralysis. After surgery to remove the tumor, DeShields suffered tremors and involuntary spasms and spent months rehabilitating without certainty about whether she would be able to return to play. She decided to keep her condition and surgery experiences private, until sharing them in an interview in May 2022.

DeShields returned to play in the 2020 season, which was held in a bubble environment due to the COVID-19 pandemic. She did not start games, as she was recovering from a knee injury, and played in 13 games while averaging 6.8 points in 17.2 minutes per game. DeShields suffered an apparent quadriceps injury in a game on August 21, and left the bubble a week later, missing the remainder of the season and the Sky's single postseason game.

In the 2021 season, DeShields began as a starter and averaged 26.9 minutes and 11.3 points per game. Near the end of the season, she shifted to a role coming off the bench. The Sky entered the playoffs as the sixth seed, and made their way to the 2021 WNBA Finals, winning the series in four games against the Phoenix Mercury. DeShields recorded 15.7 minutes and 5.5 points per game in the team's playoff run. 

In the offseason, DeShields expressed admiration for the Sky along with a preference to play for a team where she would return to a starting role.

Phoenix Mercury (2022–2023) 
As a free agent entering the 2022 season, DeShields took meetings with several teams across the league. On February 3, 2022, she was traded to the Phoenix Mercury in a three-team sign-and-trade deal involving the Sky and the Indiana Fever.

Chicago Sky (2023-present) 
On February 11, 2023 DeShields was traded to the Dallas Wings in a four-team trade involving the New York Liberty, Phoenix Mercury, Dallas Wings and Chicago Sky.

Career statistics

WNBA

Regular season 

|-
| style='text-align:left;'|2018
| style='text-align:left;'|Chicago
| 34 || 33 || 28.4 || .425 || .328 || .836 || 4.9 || 2.2 || 1.1 || 0.3 || 2.1 || 14.4
|-
| style='text-align:left;'|2019
| style='text-align:left;'|Chicago
| 34 || 34 || 30.2 || .399 || .316 || .836 || 5.5 || 2.4 || 1.3 || 0.4 || 2.2 || 16.2
|-
| style='text-align:left;'|2020
| style='text-align:left;'|Chicago
| 13 || 0 || 17.2 || .434 || .167 || .778 || 1.8 || 1.5 || 0.9 || 0.1 || 2.3 || 6.8
|-
| style="text-align:left;background:#afe6ba;"|2021
| style='text-align:left;'|Chicago
| 32 || 22 || 26.9 || .393 || .300 || .820 || 3.5 || 2.3 || 1.2 || 0.4 || 1.9 || 11.3
|-
| style='text-align:left;'|2022
| style='text-align:left;'|Phoenix
| 30 || 19 || 25.3 || .388 || .236 || .765 || 3.8 || 2.2 || 1.0 || 0.5 || 2.3 || 13.1
|-
| style='text-align:left;'| Career
| style='text-align:left;'| 5 years, 2 teams
| 143 || 108 || 26.8 || .403 || .296 || .815 || 4.2 || 2.2 || 1.1 || 0.4 || 2.1 || 13.2

Playoffs 

|-
| style='text-align:left;'|2019
| style='text-align:left;'|Chicago
| 2 || 2 || 33.0 || .436 || .333 || .833 || 5.0 || 2.0 || 0.5 || 1.0 || 0.5 || 24.0
|-
| style="text-align:left;background:#afe6ba;"|2021
| style='text-align:left;'|Chicago
| 10 || 0 || 15.7 || .340 || .250 || .800 || 2.7 || 1.1 || 1.1 || 0.1 || 1.6 || 5.5
|-
| style='text-align:left;'|2022
| style='text-align:left;'|Phoenix
| 2 || 2 || 27.0 || .432 || .333 || .714 || 4.5 || 2.0 || 1.0 || 0.0 || 3.5 || 19.5
|-
| style='text-align:left;'| Career
| style='text-align:left;'| 3 years, 2 teams
| 14 || 4 || 19.8 || .395 || .300 || .795 || 3.3 || 1.4 || 1.0 || 0.2 || 1.7 || 10.1

Personal life
DeShields' father, Delino DeShields, and brother, Delino DeShields Jr., have played in Major League Baseball. Her mother, Tisha, was named an All-American heptathlete while attending Tennessee. DeShields has a paternal half-brother and two paternal half-sisters.

References

External links
Player information and career statistics from Basketball-Reference.com

1995 births
Living people
American expatriate basketball people in China
American women's basketball players
Basketball players from Florida
Basketball players from Georgia (U.S. state)
Chicago Sky draft picks
Chicago Sky players
McDonald's High School All-Americans
North Carolina Tar Heels women's basketball players
Parade High School All-Americans (girls' basketball)
People from Norcross, Georgia
People from West Palm Beach, Florida
Phoenix Mercury players
Shanxi Flame players
Small forwards
Sportspeople from the Atlanta metropolitan area
Tennessee Lady Volunteers basketball players
Women's National Basketball Association All-Stars